Mahesh Bhupathi and Leander Paes were the defending champions. However, they chose not to play together. Bhupathi played with Rohan Bopanna and Paes played with Radek Štěpánek

Seeds
All seeds received a bye into the second round.

Draw

Finals

Top half

Bottom half

References
Main Draw

Western and Southern Open Doubles
2012 Western & Southern Open